Universidad Nacional Autónoma de Nicaragua – Managua is a Nicaraguan football team playing in the Primera División de Nicaragua of the Nicaragua football system. It is based in Managua.

History
UNAN Managua has spent much of its history struggling to earn promotion to the top flight.  Their first serious effort came in 2008–2009, when they earned their way into a relegation playoff against Real Madriz.  They lost, 7–2 on aggregate. In 2011–2012, UNAN Managua won the Clausura and earned a promotion playoff with Apertura champion Xilotepelt.  Once again, they lost.

However, in 2013–2014, UNAN won the Apertura 2013 title.  The Clausura that year was won by Real Esteli's feeder side, which was not eligible for promotion, and so UNAN automatically moved up into the top flight.  Their first season, 2014–2015, was a struggle.  The club won just eight of 36 top flight matches and was forced into a promotion/relegation playoff with San Marcos.  They won, 6–0 on aggregate, but were still not expected to have much of an impact on the table in 2015–2016.

Instead, they stunned Nicaragua by storming to a 3rd-place finish in Apertura 2015, good enough for their first playoff berth.  Then, in the postseason, they defeated Walter Ferretti and Diriangén to claim their first national crown.  It ended a decade of dominance for Ferretti, Diriangén, and Real Esteli.  Although Managua lost the season championship to Clausura winners Real Esteli, their championship was nonetheless a special one.

They spent the next two years as a regular playoff participant, then staved off relegation in 2017–2018.

Current squad
As of:31 May 2019

Achievements
Primera División de Nicaragua: 1
2015 Apertura
Segunda División de Nicaragua: 2
2012 Clausura, 2013 Apertura

List of coaches
  Edison Oquendo (2008–2009)
  Eduardo Urroz (2012 – October 14) 
  Luis Montano (October 2014 – March 2015)
  Julio César Madrigal (March 2015 – June 2015)
  Eduardo Urroz (July 2015 – December 2017)
  Carlos Garabet Avedissian (December 2017 - February 2018)
  Luis Vega (February 2018 - December 2018)
  Daniel Garcia (January 2019 - December 2021)
  Eduardo Urroz (December 2021 - Present))

Personnel

Current technical staff

Women's department
The women's team is the most successful team in Nicaragua winning 8 championships, the team is currently led by head coach TBD and features several members of the Nicaragua national team.

Honours
 Nicaraguan women's football championship: 2004, 2005, 2006, 2007, 2008, 2009, 2011 Apertura, 2012 Clausura, 2013 Apertura

References

External links
 Equipo – GoolNica

 
Football clubs in Nicaragua
Managua
University and college association football clubs